Francisco Daniel Soler Tanco (born 23 August 1992) is an Olympic male sport wrestler from Puerto Rico. Soler competed in the 2012 Summer Olympics for Puerto Rico.

References

External links
 

1992 births
Living people
Puerto Rican male sport wrestlers
American male sport wrestlers
Wrestlers at the 2012 Summer Olympics
Olympic wrestlers of Puerto Rico
People from Santo Domingo